Anthony Grant Bloom (born 20 March 1970) is an English sports bettor, poker player, entrepreneur, owner and chairman of Premier League football club Brighton & Hove Albion and majority owner of Belgian First Division A team Royale Union Saint-Gilloise.

Poker and betting

Bloom is a sports bettor and poker player, nicknamed The Lizard.

Bloom appeared in the Late Night Poker television series and also has a final table appearance on the World Poker Tour. He also made back-to-back final table appearances in the first two Poker Million events.  His first major win came in January 2004 when he won the Australasian Poker Championship in Melbourne, collecting a first prize of around A$420,000 ($320,000, £180,000).

Bloom won the £5,000 No Limit Hold'em VC Poker Cup Final in London on 5 August 2005 and won the £200,000 ($351,401) first prize.

He also had a fourth-place finish in the 2005 World Series of Poker Tournament of Champions. He was a member of the winning British team in the Poker Nations Cup. Bloom won A$600,000 for his second-place finish in the High Rollers Challenge, Event #8 of the Australian Poker Millions tournament held in Melbourne in Jan 2009.

Bloom fell short of the million-pound grand prize in the Poker Million IX event held in London on December 10, 2010. He finished second behind Gus Hansen.

In September 2022, Bloom won Poker Masters Event #8: $25,000 Pot-Limit Omaha for $360,000. It was Bloom's first time playing poker in three years and his first time playing a PokerGO Tour event.

As of October 2022, Bloom's total live tournament winnings exceeded $3,800,000.

Entrepreneur
Bloom's wealth has been accumulated primarily through proprietary or value betting on sports events.  Bloom heads a private betting syndicate which is believed to have been continuously successful year on year for a sustained period of time.  Bloom has also holds significant property and private equity portfolios.

Football chairman

Since 2009, Bloom has been the chairman of Brighton & Hove Albion, who are currently a Premier League club, having gained promotion in the 2016–17 season after 34 years out of the top flight of English football. 

He succeeded Dick Knight after securing a 75% shareholding in the club and investing £93 million in the development of the club's new ground, Falmer Stadium. The stadium had extensions in spectator capacity and received funding to ensure that it is "Premier League ready" by installing floodlights, amongst other features.

Bloom is a longtime Brighton fan and his family has had a long association with the club; his uncle Ray is a director and his grandfather, Harry, was vice-chairman during the 1970s. 

Bloom appointed former Uruguay international Gus Poyet as manager in November 2009, and together they led the team to promotion from Football League One as champions in 2011, the season before Brighton moved into their new home—Falmer Stadium. Poyet left the club in 2013 after losing in a play-off semi-final to Crystal Palace. In June 2013, Bloom appointed Óscar García as the new head coach of the club; Garcia resigned after losing a second successive play-off semi-final to Derby County and left the club in May 2014. The next manager was former Liverpool player Sami Hyypiä, who only lasted a few months in the managerial role after a poor start to the 2014–15 season left Brighton in the relegation zone. Chris Hughton became manager towards the end of 2014, and the club have been successful since. 

Hughton steered Albion to safety in their 2014–15 campaign, and then guided the club to a 3rd-place position in the Championship in the following season, missing out on promotion to Middlesbrough on goal difference. The club would be defeated in the play-off semi final, for the third time in four years, this time to Sheffield Wednesday. 

Brighton went one step further in the 2016–17 season under Hughton's management and Bloom's ownership, finishing second in the Championship and gaining promotion to the Premier League for the first time in the club's history. Bloom backed Hughton in the following transfer window, breaking several record transfer fees to improve the squad, readying Brighton's first Premier League season. On 13 May 2019, immediately after the end of the season, with the club ending at the 17th position and thus securing its top-tier status for the coming season, Bloom released a statement to the effect that "it was time for a change" and sacked Hughton, replacing him with Championship's Swansea coach Graham Potter. 

In 2018, Bloom completed the takeover of Belgian second division club Union SG.  It is understood that although Bloom is the majority owner of USG, he has no day-to-day involvement with the club which is run independently of both him and Brighton.

In the 2021–22 Premier League season, Brighton finished with 51 points, its highest ever points tally for the EPL. By finishing in 9th place Brighton also secured the highest ever top flight final position in its history.

Personal life, and other ventures

Bloom is Jewish, and has contributed significantly to the development of a synagogue and community centre project in Hove. He stepped in with the Brighton and Hove Hebrew Congregation suffering financial problems, and the funding for the development will come from his Bloom Foundation, of which he is the chairman.

References

External links
 Hendon Mob tournament results
 World Poker Tour Profile
 Jewish Chronicle feature

1970 births
English poker players
Living people
People from Brighton
Brighton & Hove Albion F.C. directors and chairmen
English Jews